Olivier Courson (born 1965) is a French film producer. Until 2015, he was the chairman & CEO (Executive) of production and distribution company StudioCanal.

Filmography
 Inside Llewyn Davis (2013) – executive producer
 I Give It a Year (2013) – executive producer
 Love, Marilyn (documentary) (2012) – executive producer
 Deadfall (2012) – executive producer
 The Awakening (2011) – executive producer
 Tinker Tailor Soldier Spy (2011) – executive producer
 Attack the Block (2011) – executive producer
  Unknown (2011) – co-producer
  The Tourist (2010) – executive producer
 Brighton Rock (2010) – executive producer
 Chloe (2009) – executive producer

References

Living people
1965 births
French film producers